The first season of The Suite Life of Zack & Cody aired on Disney Channel from March 18, 2005 to January 27, 2006.
The season introduces Zack and Cody Martin, twin brothers who move into the Tipton Hotel in Boston with their mother, Carey, where she sings and performs in the lounge. The show also centers in London Tipton, the daughter of the hotel owner, who is very wealthy and ditzy, the hotel's down-to-earth candy-counter girl, Maddie Fitzpatrick, and Mr. Moseby, the strict, dutiful, and serious manager, who is often the foil to Zack and Cody's schemes and has a liking to the piano, pocket hankies and ballet.

In the show's first season there are several recurring characters introduced: Adrian R'Mante as Esteban, Brian Stepanek as Arwin, Charlie Stewart as Bob, Estelle Harris as Muriel, Aaron Musicant as Lance, Sophie Oda as Barbara, Patrick Bristow as Patrick, Monique Coleman as Mary Margaret, Alyson Stoner as Max, Robert Torti as Kurt, Anthony Acker as Norman, Sharon Jordan as Irene, Allie Grant as Agnes, Dennis Bendersky as Tapeworm, Caroline Rhea as Ilsa, Gus Hoffman as Warren and Ernie Grunwald as Mr. Forgess.

Special guest stars and notable appearances in this season include: Victoria Justice as Rebecca, Julia Duffy as Martha Harrington, Emma Stone  as Ivana Tipton (voice) and Jesse McCartney as himself.

Production
The show was originally ordered to series for a 21-episode first season. However, after the show premiered with good ratings establishing itself as Disney's top series in key boy demographics, and only behind That’s So Raven in kids 2-11 and 6-11, the network decided to order five additional episodes to a total of 26 episodes for the first season.

Premise
Set in Boston, the show focuses on the twins Zack (Dylan Sprouse) and Cody (Cole Sprouse) who move to the luxurious Tipton Hotel, when their mother Carey (Kim Rhodes) gets a job as a singer in the lounge. The hotel is managed by Mr. Moseby (Phill Lewis), who has also taken care of the heiress of the Tipton empire her whole life, London Tipton (Brenda Song). The show also introduces Maddie (Ashley Tisdale), the teenage candy-counter girl at the Tipton Hotel, who despite being the complete opposite of London, ends up becoming her best friend.

Theme song and opening sequence
The show's theme song, "Here I Am," was written by John Adair and Steve Hampton (who also wrote the theme for the show's spinoff The Suite Life on Deck, as well as for fellow Disney Channel series Phil of the Future, Wizards of Waverly Place, Good Luck Charlie, Shake It Up, Sonny with a Chance, Jonas, So Random!, A.N.T. Farm, PrankStars, and Austin & Ally and the ABC Kids series Power Rangers RPM), with music composed by Gary Scott (who also composed the music cues to signal scene changes and promo breaks, which are styled similarly to the theme), and is performed by Loren Ellis and the Drew Davis Band (who also performed the theme to Phil of the Future, and whose performance is uncredited). The theme was remixed for the ending credits of "Rock Star in the House" in a form similar to "Beautiful Soul" to accompany the episode's guest appearance from Jesse McCartney.

Cast

Main cast 
 Dylan Sprouse as Zack Martin
 Cole Sprouse as Cody Martin
 Brenda Song as London Tipton
 Ashley Tisdale as Maddie Fitzpatrick
 Phill Lewis as Mr. Moseby
 Kim Rhodes as Carey Martin

Special guest cast 
 Julia Duffy as Martha Harrington
 Jesse McCartney as himself

Notable appearances 
 Victoria Justice as Rebecca
 Emma Stone as Ivana Tipton (voice)

Co-stars 
 Sharon Jordan as Irene
 Anthony Acker as Norman

Recurring cast 
 Adrian R'Mante as Esteban Ramirez
 Estelle Harris as Muriel
 Brian Stepanek as Arwin Hawkhauser
 Patrick Bristow as Patrick
 Alyson Stoner as Max
 Dennis Bendersky as Tapeworm
 Aaron Musicant as Lance Fishman
 Robert Torti as Kurt Martin
 Caroline Rhea as Ilsa Shickelgrubermeiger
 Charlie Stewart as Bob
 Sophie Oda as Barbara Brownstein
 Monique Coleman as Mary Margaret
 Allie Grant as Agnes
 Gus Hoffman as Warren
 Ernie Grunwald as Mr. Forgess

Episodes

References

External links

 

 *
2005 American television seasons
2006 American television seasons